Asociația Sportivă Viitorul Axintele, commonly known as Viitorul Axintele, or simply as Axintele is a Romanian football club based in Axintele, Ialomița County currently playing in the Liga IV – Ialomița County, the fourth tier of the Romanian football league system.

History 
The club finished 5th out of 16 in the 2009–10 season of Liga IV – Ialomița County and won the County phase of Cupa României, 3–1 with Recolta Gheorghe Lazăr.

Viitorul promoted to Liga III for the first time in its history at the end of the 2010–11 season. The White and Greens won Liga IV – Ialomița County and the promotion play-off played against the winner of Liga IV – Buzău County, Luceafărul C.A. Rosetti, 2–0 (Zaharia'46 and Cană '61) on neutral ground at Ștefan Vrăbioru Stadium in Ianca. The team led by Ion Nica was composed of: I.Sava – Păun, Dumitru, George Grecea (56 Pascale), Nichita, Dănilă – Toader (50 Mihai Cană), Borcea, Dragoș Zaharia, Nicolae and Adrian Velu.

In its first season in the Liga III, Viitorul secured a respectable fifth-place finish, but lost in the First Round of Cupa României 0–1 in front of Viitorul Chirnogi.

The 2012–13 season saw the team coached by Ion Nica fighting for promotion to Liga II. Viitorul finished 9 points ahead of the main contender, Gloria Buzău. However, a Romanian Football Federation inquiry proved that Viitorul did not have three youth teams in the county-level competition, as required by Liga III regulations, and gave Viitorul a 9-point penalty that led Gloria Buzău finishing first.

The White and Greens reached the play-off and finished as runners-up in the 2013–14 season. Also, was qualified in the Fourth round of Cupa României, but lost 1–3 to Farul Constanța.

Viitorul, with Cristian Sava as technical director and Ion Nica as head coach, started the 2014–15 season with the goal of promotion to Second Division. After a good start of the season - fifth place after seven rounds at two points from first place, Cristian Sava leaves the club to be Gheorghe Hagi's assistant at Viitorul Constanța, being replaced by Costel Pană as head coach, and Ion Nica as assistant. However, Costel Pană was sacked at the end of the first part of the season and Octavian Grigore was appointed as head coach in March, after two rounds from the second half of the season. With three rounds before the end of season, the club withdrew from the competition and lost all matches from the second part of the season with 0–3, ranking eleventh and relegated to Liga IV.

Viitorul spent the next years in the Liga IV – Ialomița County often ranking in the middle of the table - 5th (2015–16), 10th (2016–17), 3rd (2017–18), 7th (2018–19), 6th (2019–20) after the season was suspended in March 2020 due to the COVID-19 pandemic. In the 2020–21 season did not participate due to the high costs generated by medical protocol imposed by the FRF. The 2021–22 season saw the White-Greens finishing on 10th position.

Honours
Liga III
Runners-up (2): 2012–13, 2013–14
Liga IV – Ialomița County
Winners (1): 2010–11

Cupa României – Ialomița County
Winners (2): 2009–10, 2017–18

Club Officials

Board of directors

Current technical staff

References

External links
 

Football clubs in Ialomița County
Association football clubs established in 2002
Liga III clubs
Liga IV clubs
2002 establishments in Romania